Frederick W. Osborne (born in May, 1865) nicknamed "Ossie", was a Major League Baseball pitcher and outfielder for the Pittsburgh Alleghenys.

Osborne was born in the Northwest Territories of Canada. He played only part of one season in the majors, 1890, in 41 games including 8 that he pitched in. He had a career batting average of .238, 1 home run, and 14 RBIs. He also was 0–5 with an ERA of 8.38 with only 14 strikeouts compared to 45 walks as a pitcher.

External links

Sources 

1865 births
19th-century baseball players
Aspen (minor league baseball) players
Baseball people from Alberta
Canadian expatriate baseball players in the United States
Major League Baseball players from Canada
Pittsburgh Alleghenys players
Major League Baseball shortstops
1907 deaths
Wheeling National Citys players
Wheeling Nailers (baseball) players
Portland Gladiators players
Walla Walla Walla Wallas players
St. Paul Apostles players
Duluth Whalebacks players
La Grande Grand Rhonders players
Oakland Colonels players